Fathollah Kandi (also Romanized as Fatḥollah Kandī) is a village in Leylan-e Jonubi Rural District, Leylan District, Malekan County, East Azerbaijan Province, Iran.
 At the 2006 census, its population was 201, in 49 families.

References 

Populated places in Malekan County